This is a list of Austrian scientists and scientists from the Austria of Austria-Hungary.

Economists
Siegfried Becher, economist and government minister
Eugen von Böhm-Bawerk
Ernst Fehr
Simon Gächter
Friedrich Hayek, economist and social scientist, Bank of Sweden Prize in Economic Sciences in Memory of Alfred Nobel 1974
Rudolf Hilferding (1877-1941), Marxist and politician  (murdered by the Gestapo in Paris)
Leopold Kohr, economist
Carl Menger, founder of the Austrian School of economics
Ludwig von Mises, free-market economist
Oskar Morgenstern, co-founder of game theory
Martin Nowak
Joseph Schumpeter, economist (neoclassical), born in Triech, Austria-Hungary
Othmar Spann, economist and philosopher
Friedrich von Wieser, economist (regarded as follower of the Austrian School of economics)

Engineers, inventors
Carlo Abarth, motorcycle racer and car designer
Igo Etrich (1879-1967), aviation pioneer and pilot 
Anselm Franz, pioneer in jet engine engineering
Gaston Glock, inventor, founder of GLOCK GmbH
Claire Gmachl, quantum cascade laser and mid-IR technologies pioneer
Eduard Haas, inventor of Pez candy
Ingeborg Hochmair, electrical engineer who developed the modern cochlear implant
Viktor Kaplan, inventor of turbines for river power plants
Wilhelm Kress, aviation pioneer, inventor of the stick control for airplanes
Hedy Lamarr, known for research in frequencies, needed for mobile phones
Siegfried Marcus, automobile pioneer (vehicles of 1870 and 1889), lived most of his life in Austria
Alois Negrelli, engineer and railroad pioneer (created the plans for the Suez Canal)
Ferdinand Porsche, automotive engineer, designed the Volkswagen (the "people's car"), born in Austria-Hungary
Johann Puch, engineer and entrepreneur 
Josef Ressel, inventor of the marine screw propeller 
Edmund Rumpler, engineer, aviation pioneer
Alois Senefelder, inventor of the printing technique of Lithography
Nikola Tesla, inventor, mechanical engineer, and electrical engineer (prior to moving to Paris in 1882)
Max Valier, rocketry pioneer
Auer von Welsbach, inventor of gaslight

Philosophers
Nathan Birnbaum, philosopher (created the word "Zionism")
Franz Brentano, philosopher and psychologist
Martin Buber (1878-1965), philosopher, born in Vienna
Christian von Ehrenfels, philosopher 
Herbert Feigl, philosopher (member of the Vienna Circle)
Paul Feyerabend (died 1994), philosopher 
Philipp Frank, philosopher and physicist (member of the Vienna Circle)
Heinrich Gomperz (1873-1942), philosopher, born in Vienna
Edmund Husserl, philosopher (born in Prossnitz, Austria-Hungary)
Victor Kraft, philosopher
Nachman Krochmal, philosopher, historian and theologian
Alexius Meinong (1853-1920), philosopher (theory of objects) 
Otto Neurath, socialist, economist and philosopher
Karl Popper, philosopher (born in Austria, became British)
Moritz Schlick, philosopher (member of the Vienna Circle)
Othmar Spann, philosopher and economist
Rudolf Steiner, mystic and philosopher
Friedrich Waismann, mathematician, philosopher and physicist (member of the Vienna Circle) 
Otto Weininger, philosopher
Ludwig Wittgenstein, philosopher, born 1889 in Vienna

Physicians
Alfred Adler, psychiatrist, father of Individual Psychology
Hans Asperger, pediatrician (most known for work on autism, Asperger syndrome named for him)
Leopold Auenbrugger (1722-1809), physician (method of percussion)
Robert Bárány, physician, 1914 Nobel Prize in Physiology or Medicine
Georg Joseph Beer, physician (forerunner in ophthalmology)
Lorenz Böhler, physician
Josef Breuer, psychiatrist (forerunner in psychoanalysis)
Carl Cori, born in Prague, Austria-Hungary, physician, Nobel Prize in Physiology or Medicine in 1947
Ernst, Baron von Feuchtersleben, physician and poet
Ernst von Fleischl-Marxow, physician and physiologist (studies of nerves and the brain)
Viktor Frankl, psychiatrist, father of logotherapy
Sigmund Freud, psychiatrist, father of psychoanalysis
Karl von Frisch, physician, Nobel Prize in Physiology or Medicine
Otto Gross, physician and revolutionist
Josef Hyrtl, anatomist
Nicolaus Joseph Jacquin, physician and botanist
Eric Kandel, neuropsychiatrist (born Vienna, emigrated to the US)
Leo Kanner, child psychiatrist
Fritz Köberle, physician (emigrated to Brazil)
Karl Landsteiner (1886-1943), physician, serologist, Nobel Prize in Physiology or Medicine
Franz Mesmer (1734-1815), physician, developed an early form of hypnotism  
Ernst Moro, physician and pediatrician
Paracelsus (real name: Theophrast von Hohenheim), alchemist and physician
Clemens von Pirquet, pediatrician and scientist in bacteriology and immunology
Karl Pribram, physician, neuroscientist, originator of Holonomic brain theory
Carl Rabl, anatomist
Wilhelm Reich (1897-1957), psychiatrist
Erwin Ringel (1921-1994), Austrian psychiatrist (presuicidal syndrome)
Hans Selye, physician (emigrated to Canada)
Ignaz Semmelweis, physician (born in Hungary, Austria-Hungary)
Hans Steiner, child and adolescent psychiatrist
Julius Wagner-Jauregg, physician, Nobel Prize in Physiology or Medicine 1927
Rudolf Wlassak, physiologist and neurologist 1865-1930

Physicists, mathematicians and chemists
Emil Artin, mathematician (Artin's conjecture)
Norbert Bischofberger, chemist
Wilhelm Blaschke, mathematician
Ludwig Boltzmann (1844-1906), physicist, born in Vienna
Fritjof Capra, physicist
Christian Andreas Doppler, physicist, 1803-1853, born in Salzburg (See Doppler effect)
Paul Ehrenfest, physicist and mathematician
Heinz Falk, chemist
Kurt Gödel, mathematician (born in Austria-Hungary, became a naturalized US citizen)
Thomas Gold, astrophysicist, geophysicist, controversial for 'steady state' view of cosmos and abiogenic petroleum origin theory
Wolfgang Gröbner, mathematician (best known for Gröbner basis)
Hans Hahn, mathematician (member of the Vienna Circle)
Wilhelm Karl, Ritter von Haidinger, physicist, geologist and mineralogist of the 19th century
Friedrich Hasenöhrl, physicist
Victor Franz Hess, physicist, Nobel Prize in Physics
Nikolaus Joseph von Jacquin, chemist
Walter Kohn, Nobel Prize in Chemistry in 1998
Karl Kordesch, chemist and inventor
Anton Schrötter von Kristelli, chemist and mineralogist (red phosphor)
Richard Kuhn, chemist, Nobel Prize in Chemistry in 1938
Johann Josef Loschmidt, physicist and chemist
Ernst Mach, physicist and philosopher (Mach number)
Lise Meitner, physicist
Karl Menger, mathematician (Menger's theorem, Menger sponge); son of Carl Menger)
Ronald Micura, chemist
Richard von Mises, physicist (younger brother of Ludwig von Mises)
Otto E. Neugebauer, mathematician and astronomer
Wolfgang Pauli, physicist, Nobel Prize in Physics 1945
Max Ferdinand Perutz, chemist, Nobel Prize in Chemistry 1962
Josef Maximilian Petzval, physicist and mathematician
Fritz Pregl, chemist, Nobel Prize in Chemistry 1923
Johann Radon, mathematician
Otto Redlich, physical chemist
Leopold Ružička (born in Croatia, Austria-Hungary in 1887), chemist, Nobel Prize in Chemistry in 1944
Karl Schlögl, chemist
Erwin Schrödinger, physicist, Nobel Prize in Physics
Heinrich Franz Friedrich Tietze, mathematician
Leopold Vietoris (1891-2002), mathematician
Victor Frederick Weisskopf, physicist (worked on the Manhattan Project) 
Carl Auer von Welsbach, chemist
Anton Zeilinger, physicist
Gernot Zippe, physicist (developed Zippe-type centrifuge to extract Uranium-235 for nuclear weapons)
Mario Zippermayr, physicist, inventor of the thermobaric weapon
Richard Adolf Zsigmondy, chemist, Nobel Prize in Chemistry in 1925

Psychologists
Bruno Bettelheim, psychologist
Anna Freud, child psychologist
Sigmund Freud, founding father of psychoanalysis
Fritz Heider, psychologist
Melanie Klein (1882-1960), child psychotherapist  (emigrated to England in 1926)
Walter Mischel (1930-2018), psychologist
Otto Rank, pioneer psychologist
Paul Watzlawick (1921-2007), family therapist and psychologist

Other scientists
Ludwig von Bertalanffy, biologist, systems theory
Othenio Abel, paleontologist
Max Adler (1873-1937), jurist and Marxist author 
Christopher Alexander, architectural theorist
Wilhelm Alzinger, archeologist
Oscar Baumann, philosopher, explorer, ethnologist and geographer
Heinz von Foerster, physicist and philosopher (working in the field of cybernetics)
Joseph von Hammer-Purgstall, orientalist
Julius Hann, meteorologist
Hans Hass, biologist
Wolf-Dieter Heiss, neuroscientist
Thomas Henzinger, computer scientist, founding president of the IST Austria
Hans Kelsen, jurist; father of the Austrian constitution
Paul Felix Lazarsfeld, social scientist
Otto Loewi, pharmacologist,  Nobel Prize in Physiology or Medicine (born in Germany, but spent 40 years in Austria, from age 25-65)
Konrad Lorenz, zoologist, Nobel Prize in Physiology or Medicine
Gregor Mendel, pioneer of genetics
August Emanuel von Reuss, paleontologist
Rupert Riedl, zoologist
Joseph Rock, explorer, geographer, botanist and linguist

See also 
 List of Austrians
 Nobel Prize

 
Scientists
Austrian scientists